Dallyar Jayir (also, Dəlilər Cəyir, Dälilär, Dallardzhagir, Dallyar, Dallyar Dzheir, Dallyar-Dzhagir, and Dollyar-Dzhagir) is a village and municipality in the Shamkir Rayon of Azerbaijan.  It has a population of 5,038.

References 

Populated places in Shamkir District